The Roman Catholic Diocese of Floresta is a diocese located in the city of Floresta in the Ecclesiastical province of Olinda e Recife in Brazil.

History
 February 15, 1964: Established as Diocese of Floresta from the Diocese of Pesqueira and Diocese of Petrópolis

Leadership
 Bishops of Floresta
 Bishop Francisco Xavier Nierhoff, M.S.F. (1964.08.04 - 1988.12.12)
 Bishop Czesław Stanula, C.Ss.R. (1989.06.17 – 1997.08.27), appointed Bishop of Itabuna, Bahia
 Bishop Adriano Ciocca Vasino (1999.03.03 – 2012.03.21), appointed Prelate of São Félix, Mato Grosso
 Bishop Gabriel Marchesi (2013.02.21 -

References
 GCatholic.org
 Catholic Hierarchy

Roman Catholic dioceses in Brazil
Christian organizations established in 1964
Floresta, Roman Catholic Diocese of
Roman Catholic dioceses and prelatures established in the 20th century